Scharmbecker Bach is a river of Lower Saxony, Germany. It flows into the Hamme south of Osterholz-Scharmbeck.

See also
List of rivers of Lower Saxony

Rivers of Lower Saxony
Rivers of Germany